Herminio Antonio Miranda Ovelar (born 7 May 1985 in Itá, Paraguay) is a Paraguayan footballer who plays as a centre back for Paraguayan Primera B club Presidente Hayes. Miranda played in the Copa Libertadores and Copa Sudamericana for Nacional Asunción and Olimpia Asunción.

Career

General Caballero ZC
In 2005, Miranda featured for General Caballero ZC for the Primera División Paraguaya season in a squad with Anthony Silva, Aristides Rojas, and Brazilians Josias Cardoso and Fernando Oliveira. On 9 October 2005, he scored an own goal in the 28th minute of a 2-0 away defeat to Cerro Porteño. Miranda made a total of 18 appearances for the club.

2 de Mayo
In 2006, Miranda joined General Caballero ZC teammate Anthony Silva at Sportivo 2 de Mayo. At 2 de Mayo, Miranda totalled 3 goals in 33 appearances.

Huachipato

2007 season
In June 2007, he moved to the Chilean Primera División club Huachipato.

2008 season
In his second season at Huachipato, Miranda was accompanied in the squad by Paraguayans Henry Lapczyk and Jose Burgos.

Nacional Asunción
After a successful season at the steelers, he joined to Club Nacional alongside his teammate Ignacio Don. At Nacional, he earned two Primera División titles, the 2009 Clausura and the 2011 Apertura.

Puebla (loan)
In May 2012, Miranda was loaned to Mexican club Puebla with the option to buy the player. The club president confirmed the signing through Twitter. Miranda's signing was to fill the vacancy of Jonathan Lacerda. In August 2012, Miranda noted a goal against Lobos de la BUAP in the third round of the Copa Mexico.

Olimpia Asunción
In 2013, Miranda reached the final of the Copa Libertadores with Olimpia Asunción.

Correcaminos

Olimpia Asunción (loan)
In 2015, Olimpia were crowned champions of the Torneo Clausura with Miranda in their squad.

Presidente Hayes
On 17 April 2021, Miranda signed with Club Presidente Hayes for the Primera B season. Miranda's first appearance for the club was in a 3-1 away defeat to 3 de Noviembre under coach Edgar Denis.

Coaching career
In 2021, Miranda revealed that he was licensed to be a coach and that he would go into coaching after his playing career is finished.

Style of play
He has been described by columnist, Tim Vickery, as a defensive organizer with strong free kicking ability.

Personal life
Miranda has a business which constructs houses and apartments and then sells them.

Honours

Club
Nacional Asunción
 Paraguayan Primera División (2): 2009 Clausura, 2011 Apertura

References

External links
 
 
 
 Herminio Miranda at playmakerstats.com (English version of ceroacero.es) (archive)

1985 births
Living people
Paraguayan footballers
Paraguayan expatriate footballers
General Caballero Sport Club footballers
Club Nacional footballers
Club Olimpia footballers
C.D. Huachipato footballers
Club Puebla players
2 de Mayo footballers
Correcaminos UAT footballers
Deportivo Santaní players
River Plate (Asunción) footballers
12 de Octubre Football Club players
Paraguayan Primera División players
Chilean Primera División players
Liga MX players
Ascenso MX players
Association football sweepers
Association football central defenders
Paraguayan expatriate sportspeople in Chile
Paraguayan expatriate sportspeople in Mexico
Expatriate footballers in Chile
Expatriate footballers in Mexico